Jemmy Elton Shaw, also known as Jimmy Shaw and James Shaw, was a 19th-century pioneer fancier of the early dog show days, a promoter of dog fighting and rat-baiting contests, a breeder of Old English bulldogs, bull terriers and toy terriers and a contributor in the development of fancy rats.

Dogs
According to the Sporting Chronicle Annual, Jem owned a black-and-tan bull and terrier named "Jacko", the world record holder for rat killing.  

Shaw owned Tiny the Wonder, an English Toy Terrier (Black & Tan), famous in the City of London in the mid-19th century for being able to kill 200 rats in an hour in London's rat-baiting pits.

Business
In the mid-1800s, Shaw was the landlord of the Blue Anchor Tavern, now the Artillery Arms, located at 102 Bunhill Row, St. Luke's, London Borough of Islington. Shaw would hold rat-baiting contests in the tavern basement for spectators.  Shaw was able to maintain as many as 2,000 rats in his establishment for upcoming contests.

Establishment of fancy rats
Between the 1840s and 1860s Jemmy Shaw and Jack Black bred and sold many different colours of fancy rats and their work aided in the establishment of them as pets.

References

Further reading
References to Jemmy Shaw can be found in the following books:

 Ash, E. (1927). Dogs, Their History and Development.  Ernest Benn.
 Farman, E. (1899). The Bulldog.
 Lytton, N. (1911). Toy Dogs and Their Ancestors. Reprint 
 Rodwell, J. (1850). The rat! And its cruel cost to the nation, by uncle James pp. 1, 17, 18, 19, 21, 24, 42 and 47. Ritnsll and Weir. Pulteney Street, London, England. Reprint. 
 Rodwell, J. (1858). The Rat: Its History & Destructive Character p. 159. Reprint. 
 Wilson, R. (2008). English Toy Terrier: Black and Tan. Upfront Publishing. 

Dog breeders
People from the London Borough of Islington
Rat-baiting
Year of birth missing
Year of death missing